The Troubles in Loughgall recounts incidents during, and the effects of the Troubles in Loughgall, County Armagh, Northern Ireland.

Incidents in Loughgall during the Troubles resulting in two or more fatalities:

1974
 19 February 1974 - Patrick Molloy (48), Catholic, and John Wylie (49), Protestant, were killed in an Ulster Volunteer Force bomb attack on Trainor's Bar, Aghinlig, near Loughgall.

1987
 8 May 1987 - Declan Arthurs (21), Seamus Donnelly (19), Tony Gormley (25), Eugene Kelly (25), Patrick Joseph Kelly (30), Jim Lynagh (31), Pádraig McKearney (32) and Gerry O'Callaghan (29), all members of the Provisional IRA East Tyrone Brigade, were killed by a group of 24 Special Air Service (SAS) soldiers while they launched a bomb and gun attack on the Royal Ulster Constabulary station in Loughgall. A civilian, Anthony Hughes (36), was killed by the SAS as he unwittingly drove into the ambush and was mistaken for an IRA member.

1990
 9 October 1990 - Dessie Grew (37) and Martin McCaughey (23), both members of the Provisional IRA East Tyrone Brigade,  were shot dead by undercover British Army members, at a derelict farmhouse, Lislasely Road, near Loughgall.

1993
 24 February 1993 - Reginald Williamson (47), member of the RUC, killed by an IRA bomb attached to his car when driving along Lislasley Road, near Loughgall.

References 

Loughgall